Heart and Soul or Heart & Soul may refer to:

Film, television, and radio
Heart and Soul (1917 film), an American silent drama starring Theda Bara
Heart and Soul (1948 film), an Italian film co-directed by and starring Vittorio De Sica
Heart & Soul: The Life and Music of Frank Loesser, a 2006 American documentary film
Heart and Soul (British TV series), or All the Small Things, a 2009 drama series
Heart & Soul (Nigerian TV series), a 2020 medical series
Heart & Soul (Philippine TV series), or Kambal, Karibal, a 2017–2018 drama series
"Heart & Soul" (Roseanne), a 1996 television episode
Heart & Soul (Sirius XM), an Urban AC music channel

Literature
Heart and Soul (Binchy novel), a 2008 novel by Maeve Binchy
Heart and Soul (Rosenberg novel), a 1996 young adult novel by Liz Rosenberg
Heart and Soul: The Story of America and African Americans, a 2011 picture book by Kadir Nelson
Heart and Soul, a 2008 Magical British Empire novel by Sarah Hoyt
Heart and Soul, a 1998 autobiography by Elvis Stojko

Music

Albums
Heart & Soul (Bad Boys Blue album), 2008
Heart & Soul (Conway Twitty album), 1980
Heart & Soul (Eric Church album), 2021
Heart and Soul (Five Star album), 1994
Heart & Soul (Joe Cocker album), 2004
Heart & Soul (Johnny Adams album), 1969
Heart and Soul (Joy Division album), 1997
Heart and Soul (Kathy Troccoli album), 1984
Heart and Soul (Kenny G album) or the title song (see below), 2010 
Heart & Soul (Ron Carter and Cedar Walton album), 1982
Heart & Soul (Ronnie Milsap album), 1987
Heart & Soul (Stella Parton album), 2008
Heart and Soul (Steve Brookstein album), 2005
Heart & Soul (Teddy Edwards album), 1962
Heart 'n' Soul, by Tina Charles, 1977
Heart and Soul: New Songs from Ally McBeal, a soundtrack featuring Vonda Shepard, 1999
Heart and Soul: The Singles, by Mari Hamada, 1988
Heart and Soul: The Very Best of T'Pau, 1993
Heart & Soul, by Ben E. King, 2010
Heart and Soul, by Lisa Stanley, 2018

Songs
"Heart and Soul" (AAA song), 2010
"Heart and Soul" (Exile song), 1981; covered by Huey Lewis and the News, 1982
"Heart and Soul" (Frank Loesser and Hoagy Carmichael song), 1938; recorded by many artists
"Heart and Soul" (Kenny G composition), 2010
"Heart and Soul" (T'Pau song), 1987
"Heart and Soul" (Twin Atlantic song), 2014
"Heart & Soul", by Air Supply from Hearts in Motion, 1986
"Heart + Soul", by Black Rebel Motorcycle Club from Take Them On, On Your Own, 2003
"Heart & Soul", by Embrace, a B-side of "I Can't Come Down", 2006
"Heart 'N Soul", by Imagination from In the Heat of the Night, 1982
"Heart and Soul", by Jonas Brothers from the Camp Rock 2: The Final Jam film soundtrack, 2010
"Heart and Soul" by Joy Division from Closer, 1980
"Heart and Soul", by the Monkees from Pool It!, 1987
"Heart and Soul", by the Narcs, 1984
"Heart and Soul", by No Sweat, 1989
"Heart and Soul", by Prism from Small Change, 1981

See also
Ein Herz und eine Seele (lit. One Heart and One Soul), a 1973 German TV series adaptation of Till Death Us Do Part (UK) and All in the Family (US)
Heart and Souls, a 1993 American film starring Robert Downey Jr.
"Hearts and Souls", a 1998 episode of NYPD Blue
Pokémon HeartGold and SoulSilver, enhanced remakes of the 1999 video games Pokémon Gold and Silver